Hyde Hall in Denton is Grade II* Listed Building and was home to a branch of the Hyde family of Denton and Hyde.

The building was built by partially timber and then was partially faced with brick and stone. Below the Hyde coat of arms is an inscription dating the hall to at least 1625, and was originally built in the sixteenth or seventeenth century. In 1642 one of the residents of Hyde Hall, Robert Hyde, raised troops to aid the besieged Parliamentarians in Manchester during the English Civil War. The hall is privately owned and is listed on the Buildings at Risk Register, rating its condition as "poor".

See also

Grade II* listed buildings in Greater Manchester
Listed buildings in Denton, Greater Manchester

References

Buildings and structures in Tameside
Tourist attractions in Tameside
Grade II* listed buildings in Greater Manchester
Denton, Greater Manchester